Nadia Afrin Mim is a Bangladeshi actress and model, who was the winner of Lux Channel I Superstar television reality show that was held in 2014.

Career
Mim started her career with various television dramas and advertisements.

Works

Selected dramas

Advertisement
 Tibbet
 Pran

References

External links

Year of birth missing (living people)
Living people
Bangladeshi female models
Reality television participants
People from Mymensingh District